The 2021 Potchefstroom Open was a professional tennis tournament played on hard courts. It was the second edition of the tournament which was part of the 2021 ATP Challenger Tour. It took place in Potchefstroom, South Africa between 8 and 14 February 2021.

Singles main-draw entrants

Seeds

 1 Rankings are as of February 1, 2021.

Other entrants
The following players received wildcards into the singles main draw:
  Robbie Arends
  Vaughn Hunter
  Khololwam Montsi

The following players received entry into the singles main draw using protected rankings:
  Jenson Brooksby
  Julien Cagnina

The following players received entry from the qualifying draw:
  Mirza Bašić
  Liam Broady
  Nick Chappell
  Ryan Peniston

Champions

Singles

 Benjamin Bonzi def.  Liam Broady 7–5, 6–4.

Doubles

 Marc-Andrea Hüsler /  Zdeněk Kolář def.  Peter Polansky /  Brayden Schnur 6–4, 2–6, [10–4].

References

2021 ATP Challenger Tour
2021 in South African tennis
February 2021 sports events in Africa